Crashing Thru is a 1939 American northern action film directed by Elmer Clifton and starring James Newill, Jean Carmen and Warren Hull. It is based on the 1935 novel Renfrew Rides the Range, the seventh in the popular Renfrew of the Royal Mounted series by Laurie York Erskine. The film was shot at the Iverson Ranch and on location around Big Bear Lake in the San Bernardino Mountains of California. It was originally intended to be released by Grand National Pictures before being picked up for distribution by Monogram.

Synopsis
The steamship on which two Mountie officers are travelling is held up and robbed of its gold shipment. They pursue the gang up into the hills but are unable to detain them, They suspect one of the female passengers to be in on the job and arrest her. She turns out to be trying to recover the deeds to the mine that were cheated out of her father, but was double-crossed by the robbers.

Cast
 James Newill as Sergeant Renfrew
 Jean Carmen as 	Ann 'Angel' Chambers
 Warren Hull as Constable Kelly
 Milburn Stone as 	Delos Harrington
 Walter Byron as 	McClusky
 Stanley Blystone as 	Jim LaMont
 Robert Frazer as 	Dr. Smith
 Joseph W. Girard as 	Steamship Captain 
 Dave O'Brien as 	Fred Chambers
 Earl Douglas as 	Slant Eye
 Ted Adams as Eskimo Pete
 Roy Barcroft as 	Green - Henchman

References

Bibliography
 Pitts, Michael R. Western Movies: A Guide to 5,105 Feature Films. McFarland, 2012.

External links
 

1939 films
1930s action films
1939 Western (genre) films
1930s English-language films
American Western (genre) films
American action films
Films directed by Elmer Clifton
American black-and-white films
Monogram Pictures films
Films set in Canada
1930s American films